Robert Turnbull  (c.1819 – 21 November 1872) was a merchant and politician in colonial Victoria (Australia), and a member of the Victorian Legislative Council.

Life and career
Turnbull was born in East Lothian, Scotland, and moved to the Port Phillip District in 1840 via Van Diemens Land having arrived there in 1839 in the ship Charlotte. In Melbourne he became a partner in Turnbull, Orr & Co importing manufactured goods. He later formed R. & P. Turnbull in Market St, Melbourne.

He lived in Port Albert in the 1840s managing the interests of his firm in Gippsland where the partnership had a dozen pastoral properties between 1838 and 1857. His five brothers were part owners of some of these properties. He retained his business connections with Melbourne and in 1851 he was elected to the inaugural Melbourne Chamber of Commerce.

He was a member of the Melbourne Club and the Union Club.

His wife was Marion Paterson and they had seven children.

Politics
In September 1851 Turnbull was elected unopposed as member for Wimmera in the first (unicameral) Victorian Legislative Council. 
He was sworn-in November 1851 and held the seat until resigning in May 1853.

Turnbull was again elected to the Victorian Legislative Council as member for Eastern Province in a by-election in January 1864, a seat he held until his death in St Kilda, Victoria. He was 53 years of age and was survived by his wife and five of their children.

References

 

1819 births
1872 deaths
Members of the Victorian Legislative Council
Scottish emigrants to Australia
People from East Lothian
19th-century Australian politicians